Rhymes of Northern Bards (full title – "Rhymes of Northern Bards: being a curious collection of old and new Songs and Poems, Peculiar to the Counties of Newcastle, Northumberland and Durham – Edited by John Bell 1812") is a book of North East England traditional and popular song consisting of approximately 200 song lyrics on over 300 pages, published in 1812. It was reprinted in 1971 by Frank Graham, Newcastle upon Tyne with an introduction by David Harker.

The publication 
It is, as the title suggests, a collection of songs  which would have been popular, or topical, at the date of publication.

The front cover of the book was as thus :- 

Rhymes
Of
Northern Bards: 
being a curious
Collection
of old and new
Songs And Poems, 
Peculiar to the Counties of 
Newcastle upon Tyne, 
Northumberland, & Durham. 

Edited by John Bell, Jun. 

“Northumbria’s sons stand forth, by all confest
“The first and firmest of fair freedom’s train; 
“Each brave Northumbrian Nurses in his breast
“The sacred spark, unsullied by a stain.” 

Newcastle upon Tyne: (printed in an old English style) 
Printed for John Bell, by M. Angus & Son, and sold by them, 
and other Booksellers in Town.

MDCCCXII

Contents 
Are as below :-<br/ >

See also 
Geordie dialect words
A Beuk o’ Newcassell Sangs Collected by Joseph Crawhall 1888
Allan's Illustrated Edition of Tyneside Songs and Readings
Northumbrian Minstrelsy
Music of Northumbria

References

External links
 Rhymes of Northern Bards by John Bell Junior

English folk songs
Songs related to Newcastle upon Tyne
Northumbrian folklore
Music books